Million Dollar Listing San Francisco was an American reality television series on Bravo that premiered on July 8, 2015.
The show was greenlit by the network in July and the production commenced in October  2014. The series is developed as the fourth installment of the Million Dollar Listing franchise, following Million Dollar Listing Los Angeles, New York and Miami.

The series chronicles the personal and professional lives of three high-profile real estate agents as they try to outsell each other, listing one of the most expensive and prestigious properties around the San Francisco Bay Area.

On April 27, 2016, the series was cancelled after one season.

Realtors 
 Justin Fichelson, one of the Bay Area's top luxury brokers at Fichelson Real Estate Group.
 Andrew Greenwell, CEO and principal at Venture Sotheby's International Realty, specializing in ultra-luxury real estate in the San Francisco area. He is a graduate of Florida State University and was named one of Realtor Magazine's "Top 30 Realtors in America Under 30". Prior to starting his own company in September 2014, he worked as CEO and team leader of Keller Williams Tri-Valley Realty managing more than 150 agents.
 Roh Habibi, an agent for Coldwell Banker Previews International. In 2014, he placed in the top 6%, ranking #255 out of 4,100 realtors in the San Francisco Association served as the chairman of their Young Professional Network. He is also a member of The Financial Planning Association's Chapters in San Francisco, East Bay, and Silicon Valley.

Episodes

Broadcast
The series premiered in Australia on August 17, 2015, on Arena.

References

External links 

 
 
 

2010s American reality television series
2015 American television series debuts
2015 American television series endings
English-language television shows
Bravo (American TV network) original programming
Reality television spin-offs
Television shows set in San Francisco
Television series by World of Wonder (company)
Television in the San Francisco Bay Area
Property buying television shows
American television spin-offs